Below is a list of radio stations in Cebu, whose coverage is in part or whole of the same.

Metro Cebu
Metro Cebu includes the adjacent cities of Cebu, Mandaue, Lapu-Lapu, Talisay, and others.

AM stations
The area has about a dozen AM stations.

FM stations
There are more than 24 FM stations.

Toledo City

Bogo

References

Cebu

Radio stations